Andrzej Rudy (born 15 October 1965) is a Polish former professional footballer who played as a midfielder.

Playing career
Born in Ścinawa, Rudy started his career in football with Odra Ścinawa (1981–83). He debuted professionally with Śląsk Wrocław (1983–88), then switched to GKS Katowice (1988–89).

In July 1989, Rudy emigrated, joining Bundesliga side 1. FC Köln. After a short stint with Denmark's Brøndby IF (January–June 1992), he returned to Köln, remaining there until May 1995, subsequently moving to VfL Bochum in the second division (one season).

After leaving Germany, Rudy played for Lierse S.K. (1996–97, 1999–2000), AFC Ajax (1997–99) and K.V.C. Westerlo (2000–01), returning to Germany to retire, with SCB Preußen Köln (2001–02).

Between 1986–98, Rudy received 16 caps for the Poland national football team (three goals).

Managerial career
As a manager, Rudy worked with Borussia Fulda (2003 as a playing manager and 2004 as a normal manager), Bonner SC (2004–05) and TSC Euskirchen (2007–08), returning in the next season to 1. FC Köln, to work within the youth system.

He was the manager of Sportfreunde Siegen from April 2010 to May 2011 and worked in a short period in January 2014 as a youth coach for TSC Euskirchen.

Post-retirement
After retiring from football, Rudy found employment as a recovery driver in Cologne.

Honours
Lierse
Belgian First Division: 1996–97

Ajax
Eredivisie: 1997–98
KNVB Cup: 1997–98, 1998–99

References

External links
 
 
 

Living people
1965 births
People from Lubin County
Sportspeople from Lower Silesian Voivodeship
Polish footballers
Association football midfielders
Poland international footballers
Ekstraklasa players
Bundesliga players
2. Bundesliga players
Danish Superliga players
Eredivisie players
Belgian Pro League players
Śląsk Wrocław players
GKS Katowice players
1. FC Köln players
Brøndby IF players
VfL Bochum players
Lierse S.K. players
AFC Ajax players
K.V.C. Westerlo players
FC Viktoria Köln players
Borussia Fulda players
Polish football managers
Sportfreunde Siegen managers
Bonner SC managers
Polish expatriate footballers
Expatriate footballers in Germany
Polish expatriate sportspeople in Germany
Expatriate men's footballers in Denmark
Polish expatriate sportspeople in Denmark
Expatriate footballers in Belgium
Polish expatriate sportspeople in Belgium
Expatriate footballers in the Netherlands
Polish expatriate sportspeople in the Netherlands
Polish expatriate sportspeople in West Germany
Expatriate footballers in West Germany